Louis Edwards is an American novelist.

Life
Edwards was born in Lake Charles, Louisiana. He graduated from Louisiana State University (LSU) in 1984 with a degree in Journalism.  He also attended Hunter College (City University of New York) for his junior year.

While in graduate school studying English literature at LSU, he began writing his first novel, Ten Seconds, which would eventually be published by Graywolf Press in 1991.

In 1993 and 1994, respectively, he received a Guggenheim Fellowship and a Whiting Award for his fiction. In August 2021, Amistad/HarperCollins will publish his fourth novel, Ramadan Ramsey.

He lives in New Orleans.

Career 
In addition to being an author, Edwards has had a successful, decades-long career in the music and entertainment industry.  Since the mid-1980s he has worked for Festival Productions, Inc. in New Orleans (1986–present).  The company produces the annual New Orleans Jazz & Heritage Festival among other events.  He has worked on a wide variety of music festivals, such as the JVC Jazz Festival-New York (1987–1994), the Essence Festival (1995–2007), as well as events in Washington, D.C., Philadelphia, Los Angeles, Houston, and many other cities.

He is currently the Chief Creative Officer and the Chief Marketing Officer at Festival Productions, overseeing advertising and marketing, public relations, Internet and social media, corporate sponsorships, and merchandise.

Works
 Ten Seconds (Graywolf Press, 1991), 
 N: A Romantic Mystery (Dutton, 1997), 
 Oscar Wilde Discovers America (Scribner, 2003), 
Ramadan Ramsey (Amistad/HarperCollins, 2021)

References

External links
Profile at The Whiting Foundation
His personal website

20th-century American novelists
21st-century American novelists
Living people
Year of birth missing (living people)
Writers from Lake Charles, Louisiana
American male novelists
20th-century American male writers
21st-century American male writers
Novelists from Louisiana